St. Veneranda's Church is a Cultural Monument of Albania. It is located near Pllanë, Lezhë County and became a Cultural Monument in 1963.

References

Cultural Monuments of Albania
Buildings and structures in Lezhë
Roman Catholic churches in Albania